James Dean Monroe Beebe (August 1, 1827September 18, 1917) was a 19th-century American Sandy Hook Pilot. He is known for being the oldest Sandy Hook-New Jersey pilot, having served for 55 years as a Sandy Hook pilot. He organized the New Jersey Sandy Hook Pilots Association. His grand mother, Lucy Monroe, is a direct descendant of President James Monroe.

Early life

James D. M. Beebe was born in New York City on August 1, 1827. He was the son of Theophilus Beebe and Elizabeth Van Gelder. His father was first pilot to receive his pilot's license under the New Jersey Pilots' Commission in 1837. Beebe left New London with his parents when he as young and came to Long Branch, New Jersey where he lived for over thirty years. He then moved to Brooklyn where he lived for 22 years. 

Beebe married Elizabeth J. Sweeney (1845-1866). They had five children. His son, Captain Charles O. Beebe became a member of the Sandy Hook Pilot Association, making the family name associated with Maritime pilots for 100 years.

Career

Beebe moved to Brooklyn in 1848 and was licensed as a pilot in 1850. He was a part-owner of the pilot boat David T. Leahy, that was the subject of the launch on September 4, 1890, witnessed by fifteen hundred people at the shipyards of C & R Poillon. 

Beebe followed in his father's footsteps serving as a Sandy Hook pilot for fifty-five years. He organized the New Jersey-Sandy Hook Pilots' Association. He escaped several accidents including in 1865, when he was on the pilot boat Favorita, No. 5, that was sunk by the City of Port-au-Prince; and the Blizzard of 1888 while working with his son, Captain Charles O. Beebe, when he was shipwrecked. 

He retired from the Sandy Hook service in 1907. A clipping from a New York newspaper gave an account of the fifty-year anniversary celebration by his associates for his service.

Death

Beebe died on September 18, 1917 at the age of 90 in Brooklyn, New York. He was one of its oldest Brooklyn citizens at the time of his death. He was buried at the Green-Wood Cemetery in Brooklyn.

See also
 List of pilot boats and pilots.

References

 

Maritime pilotage
Sea captains
People from Brooklyn
1827 births
1917 deaths
Burials at Green-Wood Cemetery